1943 in professional wrestling describes the year's events in the world of professional wrestling.

List of notable promotions 
Only one promotion held notable shows in 1943.

Calendar of notable shows

Notable events
April 2, 1943  Arena Coliseo, in Mexico City, opens and holds its first professional wrestling event. The arena was owned by Salvador Lutteroth, the founder of Empresa Mexicana de Lucha Libre (EMLL) and would serve as their main venue for the following 10 years.

Championship changes

EMLL

Debuts
Debut date uncertain
Sonny Myers
Sugi Sito
Sailor Art Thomas

Births
January 15  Alberto Muñoz(died in 2019) 
February 2  Antonio Inoki(died in 2022)
February 15  Mitsu Hirai(died in 2003) 
March 16  Verlon Biggs (died in 1994) 
March 23  Johnny Powers (died in 2022)
April 8   Robbie Ellis 
April 11  Harley Race(died in 2019)
April 13  Alfonso Dantés(died in 2008)
April 16  Frankie Laine(died in 2016)
April 24  Mike Boyette (died in 2012) 
May 15  Pepe Casas
May 18  Jimmy Snuka(died in 2017)
June 4  Billy Graham
June 12  Fred Curry 
July 13  Otto Wanz(died in 2017)
July 17  Jean Antone (died in 2016) 
July 29:
Earl Black
Bette Boucher
October 9:
Betty Niccoli
Kantaro Hoshino (died in 2010)
October 22  Bad News Brown(died in 2007)
October 24  Bill Dundee
November 3 - Robert Bruce (wrestler) (died in 2009)
December 4  Katsuhisa Shibata(died in 2010)
December 31  Adorable Rubí(died in 2012)

References

 
professional wrestling